The siege of Cawnpore was a key episode in the Indian rebellion of 1857. The besieged East India Company forces and civilians in Cawnpore (now Kanpur) were unprepared for an extended siege and surrendered to rebel forces under Nana Sahib in return for a safe passage to Allahabad. However, their evacuation from Cawnpore turned into a massacre, and most of the men were killed. As an East India Company rescue force from Allahabad approached Cawnpore, 120 British women and children captured by the Sepoy forces were killed in what came to be known as the Bibighar Massacre, their remains being thrown down a nearby well in an attempt to hide the evidence. Following the recapture of Cawnpore and the discovery of the massacre, the angry Company forces engaged in widespread retaliation against captured rebel soldiers and local civilians. The murders greatly embittered the British rank-and-file against the Sepoy rebels and inspired the war cry "Remember Cawnpore!".

Background
Cawnpore was an important garrison town for the East India Company forces. Located on the Grand Trunk Road, it was directly connected to the Sindh (Sind), Punjab and Awadh (Oudh) regions.

By June 1857, the Indian rebellion had spread to several areas near Cawnpore, namely Meerut, Agra, Mathura, and Lucknow. However, the Indian sepoys at Cawnpore initially remained loyal. The British General at Cawnpore, Hugh Wheeler, knew the local language, had adopted local customs, and was married to an Indian woman. He was confident that the sepoys at Cawnpore would remain loyal to him, and sent two British companies (one each of the 84th and 32nd Regiments) to besieged Lucknow.

The British contingent in Cawnpore consisted of around nine hundred people, including around three hundred military men, around three hundred women and children, and about one hundred and fifty merchants, business owners, drummers (salesman), engineers and others. The rest were the native servants, who left soon after the commencement of the siege.

In the case of a rebellion by the sepoys in Cawnpore, the most suitable defensive location for the British was the magazine located in the north of the city. It had thick walls, ample ammunition and stores, and also hosted the local treasury. However, General Wheeler decided to take refuge in the south of the city, in an entrenchment composed of two barracks surrounded by a mud wall. There was a military building site to the south of Cawnpore, where nine barracks were being constructed at the dragoon barracks. The British soldiers found it difficult to dig deep trenches, as it was hot summer season. The area also lacked good sanitary facilities, and there was only one well (which would be exposed to enemy fire in case of an attack). Also, there were several buildings overlooking the entrenchment that would provide cover for the attackers, allowing them to easily shoot down on the defenders.

General Wheeler's choice of this location to make a stand remains controversial, given the availability of safer and more defensible places in Cawnpore. It is believed that he was expecting reinforcements to come from the southern part of the city. He also assumed that, in case of a rebellion, the Indian troops would probably collect their arms, ammunition and money, and would head to Delhi and therefore, he did not expect a long siege.

Rebellion at Fatehgarh

The first sign of the rebellion at Cawnpore came in the form of a rebellion at Fatehgarh (or Futteghur), a military station on the banks of the Ganges. To disperse the Indian troops away from Cawnpore, and lessen the chances of a rebellion, General Wheeler decided to send them on various "missions". On one such mission, he sent the 2nd Oudh Irregulars to Fatehgarh. On the way to Fatehgarh, General Wheeler's forces under the command of Fletcher Hayes and Lieutenant Barbour met two more Englishmen, Mr Fayrer and Lieutenant T. Carey.

On the night of 31 May 1857, Hayes and Carey departed to a nearby town to confer with the local magistrate. After their departure, the Indian troops rebelled and decapitated Fayrer. Barbour was also killed, as he tried to escape. When Hayes and Carey came back the next morning, an older Indian officer galloped towards them and advised them to run away. However, as the Indian officer explained the situation to them, the rebel Indian sowars (cavalry troopers) raced towards them. Hayes was killed as he tried to ride away, while Carey escaped to safety.

Outbreak of rebellion at Cawnpore

There were four Indian regiments in Cawnpore: the 1st, 53rd and 56th Native Infantry, and the 2nd Bengal Cavalry. Although the sepoys in Cawnpore had not rebelled, the European families began to drift into the entrenchment as the news of rebellion in the nearby areas reached them. The entrenchment was fortified, and the Indian sepoys were asked to collect their pay one by one, so as to avoid an armed mob.

The Indian soldiers considered the fortification, and the artillery being primed, as a threat. On the night of 2 June 1857, a British officer named Lieutenant Cox fired on his Indian guard while drunk. Cox missed his target, and was thrown into the jail for a night. The very next day, a hastily convened court acquitted him, which led to discontent among the Indian soldiers. There were also rumours that the Indian troops were to be summoned to a parade, where they were to be massacred. All these factors influenced them to rebel against the East India Company rule.

The rebellion began at 1:30 AM on 5 June 1857, with three pistol shots from the rebel soldiers of the 2nd Bengal Cavalry. Elderly Risaldar-Major Bhowani Singh, who chose not to hand over the regimental colours and join the rebel sepoys, was subsequently cut down by his subordinates. The 53rd and 56th Native Infantry, which were apparently the most loyal units in the area, were awoken by the shootings. Some soldiers of the 56th attempted to leave. The European artillery assumed that they were also rebelling, and opened fire on them. The soldiers of the 53rd were also caught in the crossfire.

The 1st N.I. rebelled and left in the early morning of 6 June 1857. On the same day, the 53rd N.I. also went off, taking with them the regimental treasure and as much ammunition as they could carry. Around 150 sepoys remained loyal to General Wheeler.

After obtaining arms, ammunition and money, the rebel troops started marching towards Delhi to seek further orders from Bahadur Shah II, who had been proclaimed the Badshah-e-Hind ("Emperor of India"). The British officers were relieved, thinking that they would not face a long siege.

Nana Sahib's involvement

Nana Sahib was the adopted heir to Baji Rao II, the former peshwa of the Maratha Confederacy. The East India Company had decided that the pension and honours of the lineage would not be passed on to Nana Sahib, as he was not a natural born heir. Nana Sahib had sent his envoy Dewan Azimullah Khan to London, to petition the Queen against the Company's decision, but failed to evoke a favourable response. In May 1857, Nana Sahib arrived in Cawnpore with 300 soldiers, stating that he intended to support the British: Wheeler asked him to take charge of the government treasury in the Nawabganj area.

Amid the chaos in Cawnpore in 1857, Nana Sahib entered the British magazine with his contingent. The soldiers of the 53rd Native Infantry, which was guarding the magazine, were not fully aware of the situation in the rest of the city. They assumed that Nana Sahib had come to guard the magazine on behalf of the British, as he had earlier declared his loyalty to the British, and had even sent some volunteers to be at the disposal of General Wheeler. However, Nana Sahib joined the rebels.

After taking possession of the treasury, Nana Sahib advanced up the Grand Trunk Road. His aim was to restore the Maratha Confederacy under Peshwa tradition, and he decided to attempt to capture Cawnpore. On his way, Nana Sahib met with rebel soldiers at Kalyanpur. The soldiers were on their way to Delhi, to meet Bahadur Shah II. Nana Sahib initially decided to march to Delhi and fight the British as a Mughal subordinate, but Azimullah Khan advised him that leading the rebels in Kanpur would increase his prestige more than serving a weak Muslim king.

Nana Sahib asked the rebel soldiers to go back to Cawnpore, and help him in defeating the British. The rebels were reluctant at first, but decided to join Nana Sahib, when he promised to double their pay and reward them with gold, if they were to destroy the British entrenchment.

Attack on Wheeler's entrenchment

On 5 June 1857, Nana Sahib sent a polite note to General Wheeler, informing him that he intended to attack on the following morning, at 10 AM. On 6 June Nana Sahib's forces (including the rebel soldiers) attacked the British entrenchment at 10:30 AM. The British were not adequately prepared for the attack, but managed to defend themselves for a long time, as the attacking forces were reluctant to enter the entrenchment. Nana Sahib's forces had been led to falsely believe that the entrenchment had gunpowder-filled trenches that would explode if they got closer.

As the news of Nana Sahib's advances against the British garrison spread, several of the rebel sepoys joined him. By 10 June, he was believed to be leading around twelve to fifteen thousand Indian soldiers.

The British held out in their makeshift fort for three weeks with little water and food supplies. Many died as a result of sunstroke and lack of water. As the ground was too hard to dig graves, the British would pile the dead bodies outside the buildings, and drag and dump them inside a dried well during the night. The lack of sanitation facilities led to the spread of diseases such as dysentery and cholera, further weakening the defenders. There was also a small outbreak of smallpox, although this was relatively confined.

During the first week of the siege, Nana Sahib's forces encircled the entrenchment, created loopholes and established firing positions in the surrounding buildings. Captain John Moore of the 32nd (Cornwall) Light Infantry countered this by launching night-time sorties. Nana Sahib withdrew his headquarters to Savada House (or Savada Kothi), situated about two miles away. In response to Moore's sorties, Nana Sahib decided to attempt a direct assault on the British entrenchment, but the rebel soldiers displayed a lack of enthusiasm.

On 11 June, Nana Sahib's forces changed their tactics. They started concentrated firing on specific buildings, firing endless salvos of round shot into the entrenchment. They successfully damaged some of the smaller barrack buildings, and also tried to set fire to the buildings.

The first major assault by Nana Sahib's side took place on the evening of 12 June. However, the attacking soldiers were still convinced that the British had laid out gunpowder-filled trenches, and did not enter the area. On 13 June, the British lost their hospital building to a fire, which destroyed most of their medical supplies and caused the deaths of a number of wounded and sick artillerymen who burned alive in the inferno. The loss of the hospital was a major blow to the defenders. Nana Sahib's forces gathered for an attack, but were repulsed by canister shots from the artillery under the command of Lieutenant George Ashe. By 21 June, the British had lost around a third of their numbers.

Wheeler's repeated messages to Henry Lawrence, the commanding officer in Lucknow, could not be answered as that garrison was itself under siege.

Assault on 23 June

The sniper fire and the bombardment continued until 23 June 1857, the 100th anniversary of the Battle of Plassey, which took place on 23 June 1757 and was one of the pivotal battles leading to the expansion of British rule in India. One of the driving forces of the sepoy rebellion was a prophecy which predicted the downfall of East India Company rule in India exactly one hundred years after the Battle of Plassey. This prompted the rebel soldiers under Nana Sahib to launch a major attack on the British entrenchment on 23 June 1857.

The rebel soldiers of the 2nd Bengal Cavalry led the charge, but were repulsed with canister shot when they approached within 50 yards of the British entrenchment. After the cavalry assault, the soldiers of the 1st Native Infantry launched an attack on the British, advancing behind cotton bales and parapets. They lost their commanding officer, Radhay Singh, to the opening volley from the British. They had hoped to get protection from cotton bales; however, the bales caught fire from the canister shot, and became a hazard to them. On the other side of the entrenchment, some of the rebel soldiers engaged in a hand-to-hand combat against 17 British men led by Lieutenant Mowbray Thomson. By the end of the day, the attackers were unable to gain entry into the entrenchment. The attack left over 25 rebel soldiers dead, with very few casualties on the British side.

Surrender of the British forces

The British garrison had taken heavy losses as a result of successive bombardments, sniper fire, and assaults. It was also suffering from disease and low supplies of food, water and medicine. General Wheeler's personal morale had been low, after his son Lieutenant Gordon Wheeler was decapitated by a roundshot. With approval of General Wheeler, a Eurasian civil servant called Jonah Shepherd slipped out of the entrenchment in disguise to ascertain the condition of Nana Sahib's forces. He was quickly imprisoned by the rebel soldiers.

At the same time, Nana Sahib's forces were wary of entering the entrenchment, as they believed that it had gunpowder-filled trenches. Nana Sahib and his advisers came up with a plan to end the deadlock. On 24 June, they sent a female European prisoner, Mrs Rose Greenway, to the entrenchment with their message. In return for surrender, Nana Sahib promised the safe passage of the British to the Satichaura Ghat, a landing on the Ganges from which they could depart for Allahabad. General Wheeler rejected the offer, because it had not been signed, and there was no guarantee that the offer was made by Nana Sahib himself.

The next day, 25 June, Nana Sahib sent a second note, signed by himself, through another elderly female prisoner, Mrs Jacobi. The British camp divided into two groups – one in favour of continuing the defence, while the second group was willing to trust Nana Sahib. During the next 24 hours, there was no bombardment by Nana Sahib's forces. Finally, General Wheeler decided to surrender, in return for a safe passage to Allahabad. After a day of preparation, and burying their dead, the British decided to leave for Allahabad on the morning of 27 June 1857.

Satichaura Ghat massacre

On the morning of the 27 June, a large British column led by General Wheeler emerged from the entrenchment. Nana Sahib sent a number of carts, dolis and elephants to enable the women, the children and the sick to proceed to the river banks. The British officers and military men were allowed to take their arms and ammunition with them, and were escorted by nearly the whole of the rebel army. The British reached the Satichaura Ghat by 8 AM. Nana Sahib had arranged around forty boats, belonging to a boatman called Hardev Mallah, for their departure to Allahabad.

The Ganges river was unusually dry at the Satichaura Ghat, and the British found it difficult to drift the boats away. General Wheeler and his party were the first aboard and the first to manage to set their boat off. There was some confusion, as the Indian boatmen jumped overboard after hearing bugles from the banks, and started swimming toward the shore. As they jumped, some fires on the boats were knocked over, setting a few of the boats ablaze.

Though controversy surrounds what exactly happened next at the Satichaura Ghat, and who fired the first shot, soon afterwards, the departing British were attacked by the rebel sepoys, and were either killed or captured.

Some of the British officers later claimed that the rebels had placed the boats as high in the mud as possible, on purpose to cause delay. They also claimed that Nana Sahib's camp had previously arranged for the rebels to fire upon and kill all the British. Although the East India Company later accused Nana Sahib of the betrayal and murder of innocent people, no evidence has ever been found to prove that Nana Sahib had pre-planned or ordered the massacre. Some historians believe that the Satichaura Ghat massacre was the result of confusion, and not of any plan implemented by Nana Sahib and his associates. Lieutenant Mowbray Thomson, one of the four male survivors of the massacre, believed that the rank-and-file sepoys who spoke to him did not know of the killing to come.

After the fighting began, Nana Sahib's general Tatya Tope allegedly ordered the 2nd Bengal Cavalry unit and some artillery units to open fire on the British. The rebel cavalry sowars moved into the water, to kill the remaining British soldiers with swords and pistols. The surviving men were killed, while the women and children were taken into captivity, as Nana Sahib did not approve of their killing. Around 120 women and children were taken prisoner and escorted to Savada House, Nana Sahib's headquarters during the siege.

By this time, two of the boats had been able to drift away: General Wheeler's boat, and a second boat which was holed beneath the waterline by a round shot fired from the bank. The British people in the second boat panicked and attempted to make it to General Wheeler's boat, which was slowly drifting to safer waters.

General Wheeler's boat had around sixty people aboard, and was being pursued down the riverbanks by the rebel soldiers. The boat frequently grounded on the sandbanks. On one such sandbank, Lieutenant Thomson led a charge against the rebel soldiers, and was able to capture some ammunition. Next morning, the boat again stuck on a sandbank, resulting in another charge by Thomson and eleven British soldiers. After a fierce fight on shore, Thomson and his men decided to return to the boat, but did not find it where they expected to.

Meanwhile, the rebels had launched an attack on the boat from the opposite bank. After some firing, the British men on the boat decided to fly the white flag. They were escorted off the boat and taken back to Savada house. The surviving British men were sat on the ground, and Nana Sahib's soldiers got ready to fire on them. Their wives insisted that they would die with their husbands, but were pulled away. Nana Sahib granted the British chaplain Moncrieff's request to read prayers before they died. The British were initially wounded by the guns, and then killed with swords. The women and children were confined to Savada House, to be reunited later with their remaining colleagues, who had been captured earlier, at Bibighar.

Being unable to find the boat, Thomson's party decided to run barefoot to evade the rebel soldiers. The party took refuge in a small shrine, where Thomson led a last charge. Six of the British soldiers were killed, while the rest managed to escape to the riverbank, where they tried to escape by jumping into the river and swimming to safety. However, a group of rebels from the village started clubbing them as they reached the bank. One of the soldiers was killed, while the other four, including Thomson, swam back to the centre of the river. After swimming downstream for a few hours, they reached shore, where they were discovered by some Rajput matchlockmen, who worked for Raja Dirigibijah Singh, a British loyalist. These carried the British soldiers to the Raja's palace. These four British soldiers were the only male survivors from the British side, apart from Jonah Shepherd (who had been captured by Nana Sahib before the surrender). The four men included two privates named Murphey and Sullivan, Lieutenant Delafosse, and Lieutenant (later Captain) Mowbray Thomson. The men spent several weeks recuperating, eventually making their way back to Cawnpore which was, by that time, back under British control. Murphey and Sullivan both died shortly after from cholera, Delafosse went on to join the defending garrison during the siege of Lucknow, and Thomson took part in rebuilding and defending the entrenchment a second time under General Windham, eventually writing a firsthand account of his experiences entitled The Story of Cawnpore (London, 1859).

Another survivor of the Satichaura Ghat massacre was Amy Horne, a 17-year-old Anglo-Indian girl. She had fallen from her boat and had been swept downstream during the riverside massacre. Soon after scrambling ashore she met Wheeler's youngest daughter, Margaret. The two girls hid in the undergrowth for a number of hours until they were discovered by a group of rebels. Margaret was taken away on horseback, never to be seen again (it was later rumoured that she survived and was married to a Muslim soldier) and Amy was led to a nearby village where she was taken under the protection of a Muslim rebel leader in exchange for converting to Islam. Just over six months later, she was rescued by Highlanders from Sir Colin Campbell's column on their way to relieve Lucknow.

Bibighar massacre

The surviving British women and children were moved from the Savada House to Bibighar ("The House of the Ladies"), a villa-type house in Cawnpore. Initially, around 120 women and children were confined to Bibighar. They were later joined by some other women and children, the survivors from General Wheeler's boat. Another group of British women and children from Fatehgarh, and some other captive European women were also confined to Bibighar. In total, there were around 200 women and children in Bibighar.

Nana Sahib placed the care of these survivors under a sex worker called Hussaini Khanum (also known as Hussaini Begum). She put the captives to grinding corn for chapatis. Poor sanitary conditions at Bibighar led to deaths from cholera and dysentery.

Nana Sahib decided to use these prisoners for bargaining with the East India Company. The Company forces, consisting of around 1,000 British, 150 Sikh soldiers and 30 irregular cavalry, had set out from Allahabad, under the command of General Henry Havelock, to retake Cawnpore and Lucknow. The first relief force assembled under Havelock included 64th Regiment of Foot and 78th Highlanders (brought back from the Anglo-Persian War), the first arrivals of the diverted China expedition, 5th Fusiliers, part of the 90th Light Infantry (seven companies), the 84th (York and Lancaster) from Burma, and EIC Madras European Fusiliers, brought up to Calcutta from Madras. Havelock's initial forces were later joined by the forces under the command of Major Renaud and Colonel James Neill, which had arrived from Calcutta to Allahabad on 11 June. Nana Sahib demanded that the East India Company forces under General Havelock and Colonel Neill retreat to Allahabad. However, the Company forces advanced relentlessly towards Cawnpore. Nana Sahib sent an army to check their advance. The two armies met at Fatehpur on 12 July, where General Havelock's forces emerged victorious and captured the town.

Nana Sahib then sent another force under the command of his brother, Bala Rao. On 15 July, the British forces under General Havelock defeated Bala Rao's army in the Battle of Aong, just outside the Aong village. On 16 July, Havelock's forces started advancing to Cawnpore. During the Battle of Aong, Havelock was able to capture some of the rebel soldiers, who informed him that there was an army of 5,000 rebel soldiers with 8 artillery pieces further up the road. Havelock decided to launch a flank attack on this army, but the rebel soldiers spotted the flanking manoeuvre and opened fire. The battle resulted in heavy casualties on both sides, but cleared the road to Cawnpore for the British.

By this time, it became clear that Sahib's bargaining attempts had failed and the Company forces were approaching Cawnpore. Nana Sahib was informed that the British troops led by Havelock and Neill were indulging in violence against the Indian villagers. Pramod Nayar believes that the ensuing Bibighar massacre was a reaction to the news of violence being perpetrated by the advancing British troops. Other suggestions are that there was a fear of future identification of key ring leaders if the prisoners were liberated.

Nana Sahib, and his associates, including Tatya Tope and Azimullah Khan, debated about what to do with the captives at Bibighar. Some of Nana Sahib's advisors had already decided to kill the captives at Bibighar, as revenge for the executions of Indians by the advancing British forces. The women of Nana Sahib's household opposed the decision and went on a hunger strike, but their efforts went in vain.

Finally, on 15 July, an order was given to murder the women and children imprisoned at Bibighar. The details of the incident, such as who ordered the massacre, are not clear.

The rebel sepoys executed the four surviving male hostages from Fatehghar, one of them a 14-year-old boy. But they refused to obey the order to kill women and the other children. Some of the sepoys agreed to remove the women and children from the courtyard, when Tatya Tope threatened to execute them for dereliction of duty. Nana Sahib left the building because he didn't want to be a witness to the unfolding massacre.

The British women and children were ordered to come out of the assembly rooms, but they refused to do so and clung to each other. They barricaded themselves in, tying the door handles with clothing. At first, around twenty rebel soldiers opened fire from the outside of the Bibighar, firing through holes in the boarded windows. The soldiers of the squad that was supposed to fire the next round were disturbed by the scene, and discharged their shots into the air. Soon after, upon hearing the screams and groans inside, the rebel soldiers threw down their weapons and declared that they were not going to kill any more women and children.

An angry Begum Hussaini Khanum denounced the sepoys' act as cowardice, and asked her aide to finish the job of killing the captives. Her lover hired butchers, who murdered the captives with cleavers; the butchers left when it seemed that all the captives had been killed. However, a few women and children had managed to survive by hiding under the other dead bodies. It was agreed that the bodies of the victims would be thrown down a dry well by some sweepers. The next morning the rebels arrived to dispose of the bodies and they found that three women who were still alive, and also three children aged between four and seven years old . The surviving women were cast into the well by the sweepers, who had also been told to strip the corpses. The sweepers then threw the three little boys into the well one at a time, the youngest first. Some victims, among them small children, were therefore buried alive in a heap of butchered corpses. None survived.

Recapture and Retaliatory actions by the British

The Company forces reached Cawnpore on 16 July, and captured the city. A group of British officers and soldiers set out to the Bibighar, to rescue the captives, assuming that they were still alive. However, when they reached the site, they found it empty and blood-splattered, with the bodies of most of the 200 women and children having already been dismembered and thrown down the courtyard well or into the Ganges river. Piles of children's clothing and severed women's hair blew on the wind and lodged in tree branches around the compound; the tree in the courtyard nearest the well was smeared with the brains of numerous children and infants who had been dashed headfirst against the trunk and thrown down the well.

The British troops were horrified and enraged. Upon learning of the massacre, the infuriated British garrison engaged in a surge of violence against the local population of Cawnpore, including looting and burning of houses, with the justification that none of the local noncombatants had done anything to stop the massacre. Brigadier General Neill, who took the command at Cawnpore, immediately began a program of swift and vicious drumhead military justice (culminating in summary execution) for any sepoy rebel captured from the city who was unable to prove he was not involved in the massacre. Rebels confessing to or believed to be involved in the massacre were forced to lick the floor of the Bibighar compound, after it had been wetted with water by low caste people, while being whipped. The sepoys were then religiously disgraced by being forced to eat (or force fed) beef (if Hindu) or pork (if Muslim). The Muslim sepoys were sewn into pig skins before being hanged, and low-caste street sweepers were employed to execute the high caste Brahmin rebels to add additional religious disgrace to their punishment. Some were also forced by the British to lick clean buildings stained with the blood of the recently deceased, before being publicly hanged.

Most of the prisoners were hanged within direct view of the well at the Bibighar and buried in shallow ditches by the roadside. Others were shot or bayonetted, while some were also tied across cannons that were then fired, an execution method initially used by the rebels, and the earlier Indian powers, such as the Marathas and the Mughals. It is unclear whether this method of execution was reserved for special prisoners, or whether it was merely done in the retributive spirit of the moment.

The massacre disgusted and embittered the British troops in India, with "Remember Cawnpore!" becoming a war cry for the British soldiers for the rest of the conflict. Acts of summary violence against towns and cities believed to harbour or support the rebellion also increased. In one of the villages, a detachment of Highlanders caught around 140 men, women and children. Ten men were hanged without any evidence or trial. Another sixty men were forced to build the gallows of wooden logs, while others were flogged and beaten. In another village, when around 2,000 villagers came out in protest brandishing lathis, the Highlanders surrounded them and set the village on fire. Villagers trying to escape were summarily executed by the Highlanders.

Aftermath 

On 19 July, General Havelock resumed operations at Bithoor. Major Stevenson led a group of Madras Fusiliers and Sikh soldiers to Bithoor and occupied Nana Sahib's palace without any resistance. The British troops seized guns, elephants and camels, and set Nana Sahib's palace on fire.

In November 1857, Tatya Tope gathered an army, mainly consisting of the rebel soldiers from the Gwalior contingent, to recapture Cawnpore. By 19 November, his 6,000-strong force had taken control of all the routes west and north-west of Cawnpore. However, his forces were defeated by the Company forces under Colin Campbell in the Second Battle of Cawnpore, marking the end of the rebellion in the Cawnpore area. Tatya Tope then joined Rani Lakshmibai.

Nana Sahib disappeared and, by 1859, he had reportedly fled to Nepal. His ultimate fate was never determined. Up until 1888, there were rumours and reports that he had been captured and a number of individuals turned themselves in to the British claiming to be the aged Nana. As the majority of these reports turned out to be untrue, further attempts at apprehending him were abandoned.

British civil servant Jonah Shepherd, who had been rescued by Havelock's army, spent the next few years after the rebellion attempting to put together a list of those killed in the entrenchment. He had lost his entire family during the siege. He eventually retired to a small estate north of Cawnpore in the late 1860s.

Memorials

After the revolt was suppressed, the British dismantled Bibighar. They raised a memorial railing and cross at the site of the well in which the bodies of the British women and children had been dumped. Meanwhile, the British conducted a retaliatory action under the command of Sir James Outram, 1st Baronet by demolishing Nana Sahib's palace in Bithoor with cannon-fire. In addition, the inhabitants of Cawnpore were forced to pay £30,000 for the creation of the memorial as a 'punishment'  for not coming to the aid of the British women and children in Bibighar. The Angel of the Resurrection was created by Baron Carlo Marochetti and completed in 1865.  It has been called by various names throughout the centuries and came to be the most visited statue of British India.  The chief proponent and private funder was Charlotte, Countess Canning, wife of the first Viceroy of India, Earl Canning.  She approached her childhood friend, Marochetti, for models.  In turn, Marochetti suggested that other sculptors be invited.  Following the Countess's death, Earl Canning took over the commission.  Canning rejected a number of designs accepting, in the end, a version of Marochetti's Crimean War memorial at Scutari, Turkey.  The understated figure is an angel holding two branches of palm fronds across her chest.  Despite assurances, 'The Angel' had some damage during the Independence celebrations of 1947 and she was later moved from her original site over the Bibi Ghar well to a garden at the side of All Soul's Church, Kanpore (Kanpur Memorial Church).

The remains of a circular ridge of the well can still be seen at the Nana Rao Park, built after Indian independence. The British also erected the All Souls Memorial Church, in memory of the victims. An enclosed pavement outside the church marks the graves of over 70 British men captured and executed on 1 July 1857, four days after the Satichaura Ghat massacre. The marble Gothic screen with "mournful seraph" was transferred to the churchyard of the All Souls Church after Indian independence in 1947. There were originally plans to replace the memorial to the British victims with a bust of Tatya Tope but the local British community objected strongly to the plans, and the bust was eventually installed some distance away from the site.

There is a plaque to Capt. W Morphy and Lieut. Thomas Mackinnon who were killed on 28 November 1857 in Lichfield Cathedral.

An additional memorial detailing the losses suffered by the 32nd Cornwall Regiment Light Infantry is located inside the west entrance to Exeter Cathedral.

Literary references
Many references to the event were made in later novels and films. Julian Rathbone describes the brutality of both British and Indian forces during the siege of Cawnpore in his novel The Mutiny. In the novel, the Indian nurse Lavanya rescues an English child, Stephen, during the Satichaura Ghat massacre. In Massacre at Cawnpore, V. A. Stuart describes the siege and the British defence through the eyes of the characters Sheridan, and his wife Emmy. George MacDonald Fraser's Flashman in the Great Game also contains lengthy scenes set in the entrenchment during the siege and also during the ensuing escape.
Tom Williams' novel, Cawnpore, is also set against the background of the siege and massacre, which is seen from both the European and the Indian perspective.
The contemporary Indian report by Kalpi devi in the local journal Hindupanch covered the incident of the punitive action by the British and burning down of Nana Sahib's palace along with his young daughter Mainavati in a prose.

The British press used it to describe the brutality involved in the public feeding of reptiles at the London zoological garden. In 1876, the Editor of the Animal World drew Dr. P L Sclater's attention to this and the press charged the Zoological Society of London with encouraging cruelty, "pandering to public brutality" while one writer in the Whitehall Review (27 April 1878), protested against "the Cawnpore Massacre enacted diurnally," and headed his article, "Sepoyism at the Zoo."

See also
 Second Battle of Cawnpore
 Indian rebellion of 1857
 Jallianwala Bagh massacre
 Patharighat massacre
 List of massacres in India

References

External links

 1857 Cawnpore via the Internet Archive
 The Siege of Cawnpore Images

Cawnpore, Siege of
Cawnpore, Siege of
History of Uttar Pradesh
Satichaura Ghat massacre
1857 in India
History of Kanpur
Cawnpore
June 1857 events
Cawnpore
Massacres in 1857